Front Elevation for a Monument to the Unknown Soldier is a painting by Antonio Sciortino, from 1917.

Description
The painting is a watercolour and gouache with dimensions of 64.5 x 220.5 centimeters. It is in the collection of MUŻA in Valletta, Malta.

Analysis
The drawing is for a proposed monument in London.

References

Sources
 
 
 

1917 paintings
Paintings in Malta
Maltese paintings
Tombs of Unknown Soldiers